× Cymphiella, abbreviated in trade journals Cymph, is an intergeneric hybrid between the orchid genera Cymbidium and Eulophiella (Cym × Eul).

References 

Cymbidieae
Orchid nothogenera